Amped is an EP by American accordion band Those Darn Accordions, released on January 22, 2002, by Globe Records.

Recorded with only a five-member line-up, the smallest at that point of the band's history, Amped was a drastic stylistic departure from TDA's previous pop and polka-infused albums, featuring heavy amounts of distortion effects on their accordions to sound more like electric guitars and organs on what was the most overtly rock-oriented release in the band's discography.

Amped was the final TDA album to feature original member Patty Brady, who left the band in 2003.

Track listing

Personnel
Those Darn Accordions
Paul Rogers - vocals, accordion
Patty Brady - accordion, vocals
Suzanne Garramone - accordion, vocals
Lewis Wallace - bass guitar
Bill Schwartz - drums, percussion, vocals

References

2002 EPs
Those Darn Accordions albums